This is a list of University of Exeter people, including office holders, current and former academics, and alumni of the University of Exeter.

In post-nominals, the University of Exeter is abbreviated as Exon. (from the Latin Exoniensis), and is the suffix given to honorary and academic degrees from the university.

Chancellors

 Mary Cavendish, Duchess of Devonshire, GCVO, CBE (1955–1972)
 Derick Heathcoat-Amory, 1st Viscount Amory of Tiverton, KG, PC, GCMG, TD, DL (1972–1981)
 Sir Rex Richards, FRS, FRSC (1982–1998)
 Robert Alexander, Baron Alexander of Weedon, QC, FRSA (1998–2005)
 Floella Benjamin, Baroness Benjamin, OBE (2006–2016)
 Paul Myners, Baron Myners, CBE (2016–2021)
 Sir Michael Barber, (2022-)

Vice-Chancellors
Principals of the University College of the South West of England

 Hector Hetherington (1920-1924)
 Walter Hamilton Moberly (1925–1926)
 John Murray (1926–1951)
 Sir Thomas Taylor (1952–1953)
 Sir James Cook (1954–1955); final Principal, first Vice-Chancellor

Vice-Chancellors of the University of Exeter

 Sir James Cook (1955–1966); former Principal, first Vice-Chancellor, 
 Sir John Llewellyn (1966–1972)
 Harry Kay (1973–1984)
 Sir David Harrison (1984–1994)
 Sir Geoffrey Holland (1994–2002)
 Sir Steve Smith (2002–2020)
 Professor Lisa Roberts (2020-)

Honorary graduates

Notable academics

Richard Acland, Education 
John Adair, Management (Leadership)
Omar Ashour, Middle East Studies
Manuel Barange, Biosciences
Barry Barnes, Sociology
Jeremy Black, History
Barbara Borg, Classical Archaeology
Adam Curle, Psychology and Education
Uri Davis, Middle East Studies
John Dupré, Philosophy
John Endler, Animal Behaviour
Edzard Ernst, Complementary Medicine
Timothy Gorringe, Theology
Alex Haslam, Psychology
Philip Hensher, Creative Writing
Ghada Karmi, Middle East Studies
Paul Kline, Psychology
William Lewis, Chemistry
Alastair Logan, Theology
Linda Long, Biochemistry
Richard Lynn, Psychology
Colin MacCabe, Film Studies
Moelwyn Merchant, English
Gerd Nonneman, Middle East Studies
Richard Overy, History
Ilan Pappe, Middle East Studies
Philip Payton, Cornish Studies
David Rees, Pure Mathematics
Nicholas Rodger, History
Roy Sambles, Physics
Richard Seaford, Classics
Dikran Tahta, Mathematics educator
Nick Talbot, FRS, Molecular genetics
Andrew Thorpe, History
Malcolm Todd, History
Sir John Tooke, Medicine
Garry Tregidga, History
Paul Webley, Psychology
Canon Vernon White, Theology (Lecturer and Lazenby Chaplain)
Michael Winter, Politics
Ted Wragg, Education

Notable alumni

Academics 
 Sir Michael Berry - mathematical physicist, known for the Berry Phase and recipient of the Ig Nobel Prize for using magnets to levitate a frog
 Iwona Blazwick - OBE, art critic and lecturer 
 Stephen J. Ceci - cognitive psychologist - PhD Psychology (1978)
 Imogen Coe - biochemist and Dean of Toronto Metropolitan University
Rose Ferraby - archaeologist and artist
 Andrew D. Hamilton, former vice-chancellor of the University of Oxford, current president of New York University
 Sami Moubayed - historian and writer 
 Rachel Owen - photographer, printmaker and lecturer on medieval Italian literature
 Raymond St. Leger - mycologist, entomologist and molecular biologist 
 Sir William Wakeham - former vice-chancellor of Southampton University
 Namira Nahouza - French author, academic researcher, university lecturer, teacher of Arabic and religious studies, and research fellow at Cambridge Muslim College

Actors and directors 
 Samantha Baines - actress and comedian
 Phil Cameron - theatre producer
 Adam Campbell - actor
 Steven Culp - actor
 Stephen Dillane - actor
 Michael Garner - actor
 Nick Hendrix - actor
 Vanessa Kirby - actress
 Jeremy Meadow - theatre director/producer
 Nicholas Pegg - actor/director
 Julian Richings - actor
 Andrew Havill - actor
 Christopher Smith - American actor and improviser
 Elaine Tan - actress

Business people
 Rachel Burnett - IT lawyer, author and president of the British Computer Society
 Phil Cameron - owner of No.1 Traveller

 Dennis Gillings - CBE, founder of the Fortune 500 company Quintiles
 Sam E. Jonah - president of AngloGold Ashanti
 Toki Mabogunje founder, Toki Mabogunje & Co and the 3rd female president Lagos Chamber of Commerce (LCCI)
 Henry Staunton - media mogul
 Neil Woodford - founder and CEO, Woodford Investment Management
Sarah Turvill, retired chairman of Willis International

Entertainers and journalists 
 Toby Amies - TV presenter, film-maker
 Katy Ashworth - children's TV chef
 Emma B - Heart 106.2 Drivetime presenter
 Steve Backshall - BBC television presenter
 Nick Baker - wildlife TV expert
 William Bemister - Emmy award-winning documentary filmmaker and journalist
 Raef Bjayou - former contestant on BBC's The Apprentice 
 Alison Booker - radio DJ
 John Crace - Guardian features writer
 Tom Deacon - comedian and Radio 1 DJ
 Tim Footman - journalist and author
 Daphne Fowler - game show champion, winner of Fifteen to One, Going for Gold, and Brain of Britain
 Frank Gardner - BBC security correspondent
 Alex George - contestant on season 4 of Love Island UK
 Rhod Gilbert - comedian
 Frank Gillard - broadcaster and BBC executive
 Simon Greenberg - Chelsea FC's Director of Communications
 Lloyd Griffith - comedian, actor and classical singer
 Isabel Hardman - assistant editor of The Spectator
 Stefano Hatfield - former editor of the i
 Lindsey Hilsum - Channel 4 journalist and international editor
 Katie Hopkins - presenter and former contestant on BBC's The Apprentice
 Paul Jackson - television producer
 Jon Kay - television presenter and journalist
 Raph Korine - Runner-up, Big Brother UK 2017
 Ted Kravitz - Formula 1 commentator
 Isobel Lang - weather presenter on Sky News
 Tim Montgomerie - editor of ConservativeHome
 Clemmie Moodie - Daily Mirror associate features editor
 James Pearce - journalist and presenter for BBC Sport
 Mark Power - journalist and photographer
 Tim Taylor - creator and producer of Channel 4's series Time Team
 Rob Walker - British sports commentator, television presenter and freelance reporter
 Matthew Wright - TV presenter of The Wright Stuff

Judges, lawyers and law enforcement 

 Patrick Kwateng Acheampong - Inspector General of Police of the Ghana Police Service - MA Police Studies and Criminal Justice (1990)
 Steve Edge (lawyer) - Partner at Slaughter and May 
 Sir Patrick Elias - Lord Justice of Appeal - LLB (1969)
 Sir John Goldring - Lord Justice of Appeal, and member of the Judicial Appointments Commission
 Tito Karnavian - Current Indonesian National Police chief - MA Police Studies (1993)
 Sir Robert Michael Owen - High Court Judge
 Fiona Shackleton - high-profile divorce lawyer
 Ambiga Sreenevasan - former president of the Malaysian Bar Council and human rights activist
 Jeremy Wright - Attorney General for England and Wales
 George L. Savvides - Attorney General of the Republic of Cyprus

Military personnel 
 Admiral Sir Jonathon Band GCB, ADC, formerly the First Sea Lord chief of the Naval Staff (head of the Royal Navy)
 General Sir Patrick Sanders, Chief of the General Staff.
Lieutenant Colonel Lucy Giles, first female College Commander at the Royal Military Academy Sandhurst commanding New College.
Major General Matthew Holmes, former Commandant General Royal Marines.

Musicians 

 Felix Buxton of Basement Jaxx
 Anthony Drewe - lyricist
 Matthew Herbert - electronic musician
 Hannah Kendall - composer
 Jackie Oates - folk star and multiple BBC Radio 2 Folk Awards winner
 Simon Shackleton - electronic musician
 George Stiles - composer
 Thom Yorke - singer Radiohead
 Will Young - singer and actor
 Call Me Loop - singer and songwriter
 Principal Edwards Magic Theatre - performance artists of the 1960s/70s
 Members of Semi-Toned - all-male A cappella group, winner of Gareth Malone's BBC 2 series The Choir: Gareth's Best in Britain

Politicians 

 
 
 Nana Ama Dokua Asiamah Adjei - Member of the Ghanaian Parliament and Deputy Minister of Information
 Nickie Aiken - Member of UK Parliament
 Tonia Antoniazzi - Labour MP
 Tengku Zafrul Aziz - Malaysian Minister of Finance
 Adrian Bailey - Labour MP
 James Brokenshire - Secretary of State for Housing, Communities and Local Government 
 David Burrowes - Conservative MP
 Esra Limbacher - Member of the German federal Parliament Bundestag
 Martin Cauchon - former Minister of Justice in Canada

 Derek Clark - UKIP MEP
 Feryal Clark - Member of UK Parliament
 Major James Coldwell - former MP and leader of the Co-operative Commonwealth Federation party in Canada.
 Michael Frendo - Foreign Minister of Malta
 Zewde Gebre-Sellassie - former Deputy Prime Minister of Ethiopia and Minister of Foreign Affairs
 Carl Barrington Greenidge - Former Vice President and Minister of Foreign Affairs of Guyana
 Kate Griffiths - Member of UK Parliament
 Abdullah Gül - former President of Turkey (2007–14)
 Ameenah Gurib - President of Mauritius
 Vilmundur Gylfason - former Icelandic politician, historian and poet
 Robert Halfon - Conservative MP and Deputy Chairperson 
 Philip Ian Hope - Labour MP and vocational education minister
 Moussa Ibrahim - spokesman for Gaddafi during the 2011 Libyan civil war
 Bernadette Jagger - Member of the Namibian Parliament and Deputy Minister of Environment and Tourism
 Sajid Javid - Former Chancellor of the Exchequer (2019–2020)
 Sigrid Kaag - Dutch politician and Minister
 Luay al-Khatteeb - Former Minister of Electricity of Iraq
 Jonathan Kwesi Lamptey - Former Deputy Prime Minister and Minister of Defence of Ghana
 Mark Lancaster - Conservative MP
 Andrew Lansley - Former MP and Former Secretary of State for Health
 Lau Kong Wah - Secretary for Home Affairs of Hong Kong. 
 Caroline Lucas - MP and former Co-Leader of the Green Party of England and Wales
 Gabriel Makhlouf - Governor of the Central Bank of Ireland and Former Secretary to the New Zealand Treasury
 Anthony Mangnall - Member of UK Parliament
 Eliud Mathu - First African member of the Legislative Council of Kenya
 Linah Mohohlo - Governor of the Bank of Botswana
 Hind Abdul Rahman al-Muftah - Member of the Qatari Consultative Assembly
 Prem Nababsing - Former Deputy Prime Minister of Mauritius
 Jonny Oates - Chief of Staff to the Deputy Prime Minister, Nick Clegg
 Pieter Omtzigt - Member of the Dutch House of Representatives
 Park Jae-kyu - former Unification Minister and National Security Council Chairman of South Korea
 Roy Perry - Conservative Politician and former MEP
 Álvaro Santos Pereira - Former Minister of Economy, Labour, Transport, Public Works and Communications of Portugal 
 Luke Pollard - Labour MP
 George L. Savvides - former Minister of Justice and Public Order of the Republic of Cyprus
 Abubakar Boniface Siddique - Member of the Ghanaian Parliament and Minister of State 
 Mehmet Simsek - Deputy Prime Minister of Turkey, Minister of Finance (2009–2015)
 Andy Slaughter - Labour MP
 Iain Stewart - Conservative MP for Milton Keynes South
 Abdullah Omran Taryam - First UAE Minister of Justice and Minister of Education, and founder of the newspapers Al Khaleej and Gulf Today
 Robin Teverson - Liberal Democrat MEP and Peer
 Abdirahman Ahmed Ali Tuur - 1st president of Somaliland (1991-1993)
 Jeremy Wright - Attorney General
 Derek Wyatt - Labour MP
 Ahmed Zaki Yamani - former Minister of Petroleum and Mineral Resources in Saudi Arabia
 Yip Hon Weng - Member of the Parliament of Singapore
 Óscar Iván Zuluaga - nominee for President of Colombia in the 2014 election

Religion
 Metropolitan Seraphim of Glastonbury  - head of the British Orthodox Church
 James Stuart Jones - Bishop of Liverpool - Theology (1970)
 Peter Smith - Archbishop-emeritus of Southwark, Vice-President of the Bishops Conference of England and Wales
 Sadiq Al-Ghariani - Grand Mufti of Libya
 Andrew Williams - bishop of the Anglican Diocese in New England

Royalty 

 Sultan bin Muhammad Al-Qasimi - ruler of Sharjah - PhD History (1985)
 Infanta Elena of Spain - eldest daughter of King Juan Carlos and Queen Sofía - MA Sociology and Education - (1990)
 Peter Phillips - eldest grandson and first grandchild of Queen Elizabeth II and the Duke of Edinburgh - Sport Science (2000)
 Zara Phillips - eldest granddaughter of Queen Elizabeth II - Physiotherapy

Sports people 
 Tom Abell - Somerset cricketer
 Mark Bamford - former cricketer
 Andy Beattie - England rugby player
 Ben Collins, Formula 3 racing driver, who appeared in Top Gear as the Stig
 Richard Dawson - Yorkshire and England cricketer
 Paul Downton - former England cricketer
 Richard Ellison - former Kent and England cricketer
 Richard Hill—former England rugby captain
 Pete Laverick - Exeter Chiefs rugby player
 Tom Lawday - Exeter Chiefs rugby player
 Henry Slade (rugby player) - Exeter Chiefs and England national team rugby player
 Sam Skinner (rugby union) - Exeter Chiefs rugby player 
 Samantha Smith - tennis player and commentator
 David Sole - former Scottish rugby captain
 Tom Stayt - cricketer
 Arul Suppiah - Malaysia and Somerset cricketer
 Gerald Trump - cricketer and schoolteacher
 Matthew Wheeler - former Northamptonshire cricketer

Writers and artists 

 Nina Allan - author of speculative fiction and winner of the Grand Prix de l'Imaginaire for Best Foreign Novel in 2014
 Steve Bell - cartoonist (PGCE 1975, St Luke's)
 Alice Birch - playwright and screenwriter
 Robert Bolt - Oscar and BAFTA-winning playwright and screenwriter
 Nick Burbridge - author of poetry, plays, novels and songs; founder of folk-rock band McDermott's Two Hours
 Stanley Donwood (aka Dan Rickwood) - artist and writer
 Jon Edgar - sculptor
 David Eldridge - playwright
 Milly Johnson - author
 Santa Montefiore - author 
 Abi Morgan - screenwriter
 Ian Mortimer - historian and historical biographer
 Roger Nash - philosopher and poet
 Suniti Namjoshi - writer
 John O'Farrell - author
 Primrose Pitman - artist 
 Mark Power - photographer
 J. K. Rowling - author of the Harry Potter books - BA French and Classics
 Robert Shearman - playwright, short story writer and screenwriter (including Doctor Who episode Dalek (2005))
 Robert Sloman - playwright and writer for Doctor Who in the 1970s
 Carol Shields - author and Pulitzer Prize winner
 Zoë Skoulding - poet
 William John Seward Webber sculptor, attended Exeter School of Art

Others 
 Belabbes Benkredda - Algerian-German social innovator, founder of The Munathara Initiative, and 2013 NDI Democracy Award recipient
 Laurie Brokenshire, CBE - Commodore and puzzle specialist
 Laury Haytayan - MENA officer in the Natural Resource Charter framework, and civil activist in Lebanon
 Dame Suzi Leather - Chairwoman of the Charity Commission
 Tuppy Owens - sexuality campaigner

Fictional alumni 
 Debbie Aldridge - character in radio soap opera The Archers, played by Tamsin Greig
 One of the characters in Jonathan Coe's novel The Rotters' Club

References

External links
The University of Exeter Aumni Services

Exeter
Exeter-related lists